The Table Talk Pie Company is an American pie company located in Worcester, Massachusetts.

Overview
The company was founded in 1924 by Theodore Tonna and Angelo Cotsidas, both Greek immigrants. In 1958 Table Talk purchased the Frisbie Pie Company, which is credited with providing the inspiration for the frisbee brand name. In the 1960s the business was sold to Beech-Nut until shutting down in 1984. The company was reopened in 1986 by Tonna's son-in-law, Christo Cocaine.

Table Talk Pies is perhaps best known for their 4-inch snack pies, although they also produce 8-inch pies. The company produces 180,000 4-inch pies and 80,000 8-inch pies daily with flavors that include blueberry, apple, lemon, chocolate eclair, pineapple, cherry, pumpkin, peach, pecan, banana creme, and chocolate creme. Table Talk Pies is the manufacturer of  Walmart's private label, 74-cent Freshness Guaranteed, The Bakery collection pies. Of the 250 million pies per year Table Top Pies manufacturers, 185 million pies goes to Walmart.

In 2016 the company announced plans to build an additional production plant as well as open its first retail store in more than 20 years.
The store was opened on Canal Street in Worcester on January 25, 2017. Construction began on a new 120,000-plus square foot production bakery in August of 2020 within the former Crompton & Knowles Looms Works complex.

References

External links

Companies based in Massachusetts
Companies based in Worcester, Massachusetts
Food and drink companies established in 1924
1924 establishments in Massachusetts